The Hotel New Hampshire is a 1984 comedy-drama film written and directed by Tony Richardson based on John Irving's 1981 novel of the same name. A co-production from the United Kingdom, Canada, and the United States, it stars Jodie Foster, Beau Bridges, Rob Lowe, Nastassja Kinski, also featuring Wilford Brimley, Amanda Plummer, Matthew Modine, and Seth Green. The film follows the Berry family that weathers all sorts of disasters and keeps going in spite of it all.

In an introductory foreword that he wrote for a later edition of the novel, author Irving stated that he was thrilled when Richardson informed him that he wanted to adapt the book to the screen.  Irving wrote that he was very happy with the adaptation, complaining only that he felt Richardson tried to make the film too faithful to the book, noting the manner in which Richardson would often speed up the action in an attempt to include more material onscreen.

Noted for its assortment of oddball characters, The Hotel New Hampshire was theatrically released by Orion Pictures on March 9, 1984. Although a box office failure grossing $5.1 million against its $7.5 million budget, it has been praised by the critics, particularly for its screenplay, performances, and faithful adaptation.

Plot
In the 1950s, Win Berry and his wife have five children, John, Franny, Frank, Lilly, and Egg. The Berrys decide to open a hotel near the prep school that John, Franny, and Frank attend; they call it the Hotel New Hampshire.

John loses his virginity to the hotel waitress. Frank comes out to Franny and John. Franny is raped by big man on campus Chip Dove and his buddies, and is rescued by Junior Jones and other black members of the football team. John confesses that he's in love with her. The family dog, Sorrow, dies and Frank has him stuffed. Sorrow's reappearance at Christmas causes grandfather Iowa Bob to suffer a fatal heart attack.

A letter arrives from their friend Freud, inviting the Berrys to move to Vienna and run Freud's gasthaus. The family flies to Europe; tragically, the plane carrying Mrs. Berry and Egg explodes, killing them. In Vienna, the family moves into the gasthaus and renames it Hotel New Hampshire.

An upper floor houses prostitutes and the basement is occupied by various political radicals. Assisting Freud, who has gone blind, is Susie the Bear, a young lesbian who lives her life almost completely in a bear costume. One of the radicals, Ernst, resembles Chip Dove and Franny becomes infatuated with him. Susie and John, who are both in love with Franny, try to keep her away from him. Susie is initially successful in seducing Franny, who soon ends up with Ernst. Lilly, now an adult but still in a 13-year-old body, begins writing a novel called Trying to Grow.

Miss Miscarriage, a radical, grows very fond of the family, and especially of Lilly. She invites John to hers, sleeping with him, then warns him to get the family out of Vienna. For her trouble, another of the radicals murders her. Back at the hotel, John and the rest of the family are caught up in the radicals' plan to blow up the Vienna State Opera with a car bomb. The blind Freud, to spare the family, volunteers to drive with one of the radicals. As he leaves, the Berrys attack the remaining radicals and Freud detonates the bomb right outside the hotel. Ernst is killed and Win is blinded in the explosion.

Hailed as heroes by the Austrians, the Berry family decides to return home. Lilly's novel is published and the interest in the Berrys' story leads to a biopic, written by Lilly and starring Franny as herself. The Berrys are in New York City when John and Susie run into Chipper Dove on the streets. The group lure him to Franny's hotel suite and take their revenge upon him, until Franny calls it off.

Meanwhile, John's love for Franny has not abated. She finally calls him over to her room, and hoping to get him over it once and for all, has sex with him for almost a day. Franny's Hollywood career is beginning to take off, with Frank acting as her agent and with Junior Jones back in the picture. Lilly's writing career has stalled, and depressed and suffering from writer's block, she commits suicide.

Later, John is staying with his father at the latest Hotel New Hampshire, which stands empty. Susie comes to stay with them and she and John become involved. Win heartily approves because, as he puts it, every hotel needs a bear.

Cast

Production
Many outdoor scenes were shot at the Hotel Tadoussac. Tadoussac is a village of 857 inhabitants (2005) in Quebec, Canada, which was once an important seventeenth century French trading post.

Lowe said "I can't wait for the movie to open. I think it's wonderful, and it really gives me a showcase to do some things I haven't been able to do."

As a guest on the January 12, 2022, episode of the podcast “Fly on the Wall with Dana Carvey and David Spade”, Rob Lowe said Matthew Modine accidentally broke his nose with a steel-toed boot on a stunt gone wrong. Lowe claims the director was so mad at Modine, something evident during the whole production, he had his voice dubbed in post production by someone else.

Music
The rock band Queen was asked by producers to compose an entire soundtrack for the film, but the producers later changed their minds in favour of classical music. Freddie Mercury had already composed the song "Keep Passing the Open Windows" and so it ended up on their 1984 album The Works.

"Keep passing the open windows"
This phrase recurs throughout the film as a catchphrase among the Berry family. It is drawn from a story that the Berry parents tell their children, about a street performer called "The King of Mice". Saying "keep passing the open windows" is the family's way of telling each other to persevere. Lilly kills herself by jumping, having failed to pass that open window.

Flag error
When the Berry family is honored by the Austrian government, the hall is decorated not with Austrian flags, but instead with the flag of Tahiti, which is similar with its red and white stripes but has quite different and unequal proportions on its stripes.

Reception

Box office
The Hotel New Hampshire opened on March 9, 1984, earning $1,075,800 in its opening weekend, ranking No. 11 at the United States box office. By the end of its run, the film grossed $5,142,858 in the domestic box office. Based on an estimated $7.5 million budget, this can be considered a box office bomb.

Rob Lowe later said "When some studios do get a good movie, a movie that's different, they kill it. Orion – I hate that studio; I won't work for them again for all the money in the world – releases Hotel New Hampshire with a cartoon of a bear: people thought they were going to see Garfield the Cat. Then they change it to a bicycle for five: people thought they were going to see the Von Trapp family."

Critical reception
On Rotten Tomatoes the film has an approval rating of 71% based on 14 reviews, with an average rating of 6.26/10.

Home media
The film was released on Region 1 DVD on July 10, 2001.

It was released on Blu-ray on January 5, 2016.

References
 https://open.spotify.com/episode/02avTs0TF3YxAePmW2WtVV?si=_BdtNmAhReKmsgDXjgk0Zw

External links
 
 
 Movie stills
 

1984 films
1980s English-language films
1984 LGBT-related films
1980s romantic comedy-drama films
American coming-of-age comedy-drama films
American independent films
American LGBT-related films
American romantic comedy-drama films
American satirical films
British coming-of-age comedy films
British independent films
British LGBT-related films
British romantic comedy-drama films
Canadian romantic comedy-drama films
Canadian coming-of-age comedy-drama films
Canadian independent films
Canadian LGBT-related films
English-language Canadian films
Films directed by Tony Richardson
Bisexuality-related films
Films about dysfunctional families
Films about interracial romance
Films about terrorism
Films based on American novels
Films based on works by John Irving
Films set in Austria
Films set in hotels
Films set in the 1950s
Films set in New Hampshire
Films shot in Montreal
Gang rape in fiction
Incest in film
Lesbian-related films
Orion Pictures films
Films about rape
1984 comedy films
1984 drama films
1980s American films
1980s Canadian films
1980s British films